Sebastian Patzler (born 24 October 1990) is a German footballer who plays as a goalkeeper for Wuppertaler SV.

External links
 
 
 

1990 births
Living people
Association football goalkeepers
German footballers
SV Werder Bremen II players
Kickers Emden players
1. FC Union Berlin players
TuS Koblenz players
FC Viktoria 1889 Berlin players
FC Viktoria Köln players
Wuppertaler SV players
3. Liga players
Regionalliga players
Footballers from Berlin